Lufthansa CityLine GmbH is a German airline with its headquarters on the grounds of Munich Airport. It is a wholly owned subsidiary of Lufthansa and maintains hubs at Frankfurt Airport and Munich Airport, from where it operates a dense domestic and European network as a member of Lufthansa Regional.

History

Early years
The airline was founded as Ostfriesische Lufttaxi (OLT) in 1958 and became Ostfriesische Lufttransport (OLT) in 1970 - which existed until 2013 as a separate airline - in Emden.  It was reorganised and renamed as DLT Luftverkehrsgesellschaft mbH on 1 October 1974 and began cooperation with Lufthansa in 1978 with short-range international routes.

By 1989, all operations were on behalf of Lufthansa. In March 1992, DLT became a wholly owned subsidiary of Lufthansa and was renamed Lufthansa CityLine. Lufthansa CityLine employs 2,332 people, of whom 664 are cockpit crew, 849 cabin crew and 819 work in the technical and administrative areas as of 31 December 2011.

Lufthansa placed an order on 17 April 2007 for 30 Embraer E190/E195 and 15 Bombardier CRJ900 aircraft to directly replace CityLine's fleet of BAe 146 and Avro RJ aircraft. The last Avro RJ85 took off from Cologne Bonn Airport on 27 August 2012 as LH1985.

Development since 2014
In late 2014, parent company Lufthansa announced it would begin transferring eight of its Airbus A340-300 aircraft to CityLine. After reconfiguration to a high-density configuration, these aircraft would be owned by CityLine and operated by CityLine pilots, but wet-leased back to Lufthansa to be used on leisure routes and serviced by Lufthansa cabin crews starting in 2015. The first destinations to be served by the new Bombardier CRJ-700s which left CityLine's fleet by March 2015.

In October 2017, a new labour agreement between Lufthansa and its pilot unions was reached. As part of this agreement, the wetlease operations of Lufthansa CityLine on behalf of Lufthansa consisting of eight Airbus A340s were gradually terminated.

As part of Lufthansa's new corporate design introduced in early 2018, Lufthansa Regional aircraft operated by Lufthansa CityLine are also receiving the new livery, with the Lufthansa Regional titles being removed from the fuselage and replaced by Lufthansa.

In August 2020, Lufthansa CityLine handed back six Airbus A340-300 longhaul aircraft it operated for parent Lufthansa as part of their revised leisure route strategy. In spring 2022, the airline transferred their last two remaining Embraer 195 to Air Dolomiti. In the same time, they were given operations of two  Airbus A321P2F converted freighter aircraft on behalf of Lufthansa Cargo as well as several Airbus A319-100 to be flown for Lufthansa mainline. Additionally, Lufthansa announced in 2023 to relocate several of their A320neo to Lufthansa CityLine.

Corporate affairs
The airline was previously headquartered at Cologne Bonn Airport. In 1998 the airline moved its offices to the security area of that airport; several of its departments however were in Munich. In 2009 the airline moved its head office into the former Cologne/Bonn Airport administrative building. In May 2013 it was announced that the management and administration offices of CityLine would be relocated from Cologne to Munich. The move was completed as of September 2014. Its corporate headquarters are now at the Flight Operations Center (FOC) at Munich Airport.

Destinations

Fleet

Current fleet
, the Lufthansa CityLine fleet consists of the following aircraft:

Historical fleet

Over the years, Lufthansa CityLine has operated the following aircraft types:

Accidents and incidents
On 6 January 1993, Lufthansa Flight 5634 from Bremen to Paris, which was carried out under the Lufthansa CityLine brand using a Contact Air Dash 8-300 (registered D-BEAT), hit the ground 1800 metres short of the runway of Paris-Charles de Gaulle Airport, resulting in the death of four out of the 23 passengers on board. The four crew members survived. The accident occurred after the pilot had to abort the final approach to the airport because the runway had been closed due to the aircraft ahead, a Korean Air Boeing 747, suffering a blown tire upon landing.
On 28 December 1999, a passenger on board Lufthansa Flight 5293 from Prague to Düsseldorf, which was operated by Lufthansa CityLine using a Bombardier CRJ100 aircraft (registered D-ACJA), claimed to have a bomb on board and demanded the flight be diverted to the United Kingdom. The pilots convinced him to have a fuel stop at Düsseldorf Airport, where all passengers left the plane (many of them unaware of the hijacking attempt), and the perpetrator was arrested.
On 5 July 2014, Lufthansa Flight 1360 from Frankfurt to Katowice, operated by Lufthansa CityLine using a Bombardier CRJ700 aircraft (registered D-ACPJ), landed on an unopened and under construction runway at Katowice International Airport. The pilots performed a normal approach from the East in good conditions and visibility before landing on the closed runway. No one was hurt, and the aircraft later made a technical flight to land on the correct runway. The Polish State Commission on Aircraft Accidents Investigation made recommendations to add additional markings to the runway (in the form of red X shapes on the runway), and to modify the ATIS to include warnings about the closed runway. The CAT I ILS was disabled due to the construction, and the aircraft featured an older EGPWS that lacked a "Smart Landing" mode and high resolution map of the area which prevented it from informing the crew of the situation. During the approach, PAPI and threshold lights were set to maximum brightness. The incident is still being investigated by Polish authorities.

References

External links

 
Airlines of Germany
European Regions Airline Association
Airlines established in 1958
Lufthansa
Companies based in Cologne
1958 establishments in West Germany